Josef Zemann (25 May 1923 – 16 October 2022) was an Austrian mineralogist and geologist.

Life and work
Zemann was born on 25 May 1923 in Vienna. He studied mineralogy at the University of Vienna where he received his PhD for work with Felix Machatschki in 1946. Zemann worked with Martin J. Buerger at the Massachusetts Institute of Technology in 1951 and 1952. He became director of the Institute of Mineralogy and Crystallography of the University of Göttingen. From 1967 until his retirement in 1989 he was head of the Institute of Mineralogy and Crystallography of the University of Vienna.

Zemann died on 16 October 2022, at the age of 99.

Honours
The mineral Zemannite Mg0.5ZnFe3+[TeO3]3 • 4.5 H2O was named after him in the 1960s.

References

1923 births
2022 deaths
Austrian mineralogists
Academic staff of the University of Vienna
Austrian expatriates in the United States
Massachusetts Institute of Technology staff
Austrian expatriates in Germany
Austrian geologists
Scientists from Vienna
Members of the German Academy of Sciences Leopoldina
Members of the Austrian Academy of Sciences
Members of the Hungarian Academy of Sciences
Members of the Polish Academy of Learning
Members of the Croatian Academy of Sciences and Arts
Members of the Göttingen Academy of Sciences and Humanities
Academic staff of the University of Göttingen